Acrocercops obversa is a moth of the family Gracillariidae, known from Guyana. It was described by Edward Meyrick in 1915.

References

obversa
Moths of South America
Moths described in 1915